Erasmus Quellinus can refer to:

 Erasmus Quellinus the Elder (1584–1640), a Flemish sculptor
 Erasmus Quellinus the Younger (1607–1678), a Flemish painter